Karpovich is a surname that may refer to:

 Andrei Karpovich (born 1981), Kazakh footballer who currently plays for FC Lokomotiv Astana
 Ihar Karpovich (born 1988), Belarusian footballer who currently plays for Naftan Novopolotsk
 Maksim Karpovich (born 1986), Belarusian footballer who currently plays for Naftan Novopolotsk
 Michael Karpovich (1888–1959), Russian-American historian of Russia
 Miroslava Karpovich (born 1986), Russian actress of Ukrainian origin

See also

Karlovich